Cradle of Love may refer to:
Songs
Cradle of Love (Johnny Preston song), 1960
Cradle of Love (Billy Idol song), 1990
TV Shows
The English title of the Philippine TV drama Duyan